Philip Charles Lithman (17 June 1949 – 1 July 1987), who performed under the stage name Snakefinger, was an English musician, singer and songwriter. A multi-instrumentalist, he was best known for his guitar and violin work and his collaborations with The Residents.

History
Lithman was born in Tooting, South London, and came from the British blues scene. He moved to San Francisco in 1971 and became associated with the avant-garde group The Residents.  It is said he was given the name 'Snakefinger' by The Residents themselves based on a photograph of Lithman performing, in which his finger looks like a snake about to attack his violin.

In 1972 Lithman returned to England and formed the pub rock band Chilli Willi and the Red Hot Peppers with Martin Stone, ex-member of Mighty Baby and a fellow ex-member of Junior's Blues Band.  As a duo, they released the album Kings of Robot Rhythm. In 1974, as a full band and popular live act in Britain, they released Bongos Over Balham.

Chilli Willi lasted until 1975, their last record not selling well, and by 1976 Lithman was back in the United States, this time in Los Angeles, California, seeking a recording contract, shopping his rock-style demos.

After a few years, Lithman moved back to San Francisco, reconnected with The Residents, and performed and recorded with them.  Lithman's solo records, recorded under the name Snakefinger, were released by their record label Ralph Records.

His first album on Ralph was Chewing Hides the Sound in 1979, featuring original material co-written with The Residents as well as esoteric covers like Kraftwerk's "The Model". The songs showcased Lithman's distinctive slide guitar playing and often surreal imagery. This album was followed by Greener Postures in 1980, which included his first solo compositions as Snakefinger.

While on tour in Australia in 1980, Lithman had a heart attack that left him hospitalised for six months.

In 1982, Lithman formed his backing band The Vestal Virgins with former Captain Beefheart sideman Eric Drew Feldman.  Snakefinger and The Vestal Virgins released Manual of Errors on Ralph in 1982. This was followed by the blues cover album Snakefinger's History of the Blues: Live in Europe in 1984. Lithman released his fourth and final album, Night of Desirable Objects in 1986, which consisted of largely original material.

Lithman performed with The Residents on their 13th Anniversary Tour in 1986.

Death
On 1 July 1987, Snakefinger and his band, The Vestal Virgins, arrived in Linz, Austria, on the European Night tour. The next morning, he was found dead in a guestroom of the Posthof Club where the band had been due to perform. He had suffered a heart attack. His single "There's No Justice in Life" was released on the same day.

Discography

Chilli Willi and the Red Hot Peppers
 Kings of the Robot Rhythm (1972)
 Bongos over Balham (1974)
 I'll Be Home (1996)

Snakefinger
 The Spot (1978)
 Chewing Hides the Sound (1979)
 The Man in the Dark Sedan / Womb to Worm (1980)
 Greener Postures (1980)
 Manual of Errors (1982)
 Against the Grain (1983)
 Snakefinger's History of the Blues: Live in Europe (1984)
 Snakefinger's Vestal Virgins: Live in Chicago (1986; 1996)
 Night of Desirable Objects (1987; 1993)
 Snakefinger: A Collection (1988)
 Philip Charles Lithman aka Snakefinger (1993)
 Live at the Savoy 1981 (2010)

The Residents
 Baby Sex (1971; 2019)
 "Satisfaction" (1976)
 Fingerprince (1977)
 Duck Stab!/Buster & Glen (1978)
 Eskimo (1979)
 Diskomo (1980)
 The Commercial Album (1980)
 The Tunes of Two Cities (1982)
 Residue of the Residents (1983)
 Title in Limbo (1983)
 The Thirteenth Anniversary Show (1985–1987)
 Stars & Hank Forever: The American Composers Series (1986)

The Club Foot Orchestra
 Wild Beasts (1986)

Compilation albums
 Savoy Sound – Wave Goodbye (1981)
 Potatoes: A Collection Of Folk Songs by Ralph Records (1987)
 song: "The Ballad Of Sawney Beane/Sawney's Death Dance" by Snakefinger & His Midi-Evil Vestal Virgins
 Beets (1990)
 song: "Reptology"

Collaborators
Paul Bailey (guitar, banjo, and sax player)
Dave Barret
Michael "Miguel" Bertel (Rhythm Guitarist)
6025 (former Dead Kennedys guitarist)
Beth Custer
Raoul N. Diseimbote (piano)
Dick 'Deluxe' Egner
Josh Ende (wind, brass)
Eric Drew Feldman (worked with The Residents, Captain Beefheart, Pere Ubu, Pixies, P.J. Harvey, and Frank Black)
Opter Flame
George B. George (bass player)
John H Seabury (bass player) Member of Berkeley's Psycotic Pineapple
Ben Guy (bass player)
Colin Hansford (guitar player)
Dave Kopplin
Nick Lowe (bass)
Stephen MacKay (Tenor)
Richard Marriott (wind, brass)
Paul Riley (bass player)
Steve Royal (drummer)
Jonny B. Ryan (Philip's drummer from 1980 onward)
N. Senada (ethnomusicologist)
Michael Steele (worked with The Bangles)
Martin Stone (guitarist, literary expert)
Pete Thomas (drummer)
David Whitten (bass player)

References

External links
 Discogs Page
 Allmusic Biography

1949 births
1987 deaths
People from Tooting
English rock guitarists
English blues guitarists
English male guitarists
British multi-instrumentalists
British violinists
British male violinists
Musicians from London
20th-century English musicians
The Residents
20th-century British guitarists
20th-century violinists
Chilli Willi and the Red Hot Peppers members
20th-century British male musicians